The Alex Fraser Research Forest is 98.02 km² of crown land in the Cariboo region of British Columbia, Canada. It is managed by the Faculty of Forestry at the University of British Columbia, to create opportunities for education, research and demonstration of sustainable forest management and to produce a sustainable flow of values in a financially self-sufficient manner. The forest is named after Alex Fraser who was a politician; the Alex Fraser Bridge in Vancouver was also named for him.

See also 

 Conservation movement
 Environmental protection

References

Geography of the Cariboo
Research forests
University of British Columbia